Andrew Martin was a Democratic member of the Wisconsin State Assembly. He served during the 1875 and 1876 sessions. Reports have differed on the date of Martin's birth. He was born in Prussia.

References

Democratic Party members of the Wisconsin State Assembly
Year of death missing